Saints Row: Gat out of Hell is a 2015 action-adventure game developed by Volition and High Voltage Software, published by Deep Silver and distributed by Square Enix in North America. It was released for PlayStation 3, PlayStation 4, Windows, Xbox 360, Xbox One, and Linux. The PlayStation 3 and Xbox 360 versions of the game were released both physically and digitally; so were the PlayStation 4 and Xbox One versions, although the latter two also saw a release bundled alongside Saints Row IV: Re-Elected.

The game is a standalone expansion to 2013's Saints Row IV, and does not require the base game to be played. It serves as an epilogue to Saints Row IV, and follows Third Street Saints members Johnny Gat and Kinzie Kensington as they try to rescue "the Boss" from Hell after they are kidnapped by Satan. Gat out of Hell was met with mixed reviews from critics, who praised its unique premise, setting, and entertaining gameplay, but criticized for its short length, dated graphics, repetitive side content, and technical issues.

Gameplay
The player controls Johnny Gat or Kinzie Kensington in an open world environment. Gat out of Hell shares many gameplay aspects with the previous installments, being primarily played as a third-person shooter in an open world city scattered with quests, secondary objectives, and various collectibles. Superhuman abilities return from Saints Row IV. Gat out of Hell introduces "angelic flight", giving wings to the player. Unlike past Saints Row games, players cannot customize the playable characters; however, by importing a Saints Row IV save, players can import their custom Boss character to replace the default Boss.

Unlike game progression in previous titles, players advance through the story by completing activities to fill a "Satan's Wrath" meter, which unlocks cutscenes and further story elements. Gat out of Hell takes place in an open world new to the series, New Hades, made up of five islands: Shantytown, Barrens, Downtown, Forge, and the Den, all surrounding a central tower on a middle island.

The player is able to fly around the open-world hell. They can also summon demon allies to flight alongside them. The game's weapons are inspired by the seven deadly sins (e.g. the Gluttony Gun that shoots cake batter on enemies for other people to consume).

Plot
The Third Street Saints hold a birthday party for lieutenant Kinzie Kensington (Natalie Lander) on their spaceship, but while playing a game of Ouija with a board that once belonged to Aleister Crowley, they unwittingly contact Satan (Travis Willingham), who proclaims that the Boss (Troy Baker, Kenn Michael, Robin Atkin Downes, Laura Bailey, Diane Michelle, Sumalee Montano, or Nolan North) will marry his daughter Jezebel (Kate Reinders). Satan then drags the Boss down to Hell, and Johnny Gat (Daniel Dae Kim) and Kinzie volunteer to rescue them.

Arriving in Hell's capital city of New Hades, Johnny and Kinzie find that the Ultor Corporation has a branch here and confront their CEO and former Saints enemy, Dane Vogel (Jay Mohr). Vogel denies involvement in the Boss' kidnapping, but admits he is taking advantage of Hell's economy, and offers to help the Saints save the Boss. At Vogel's advice, Johnny and Kinzie attempt to get Satan's attention by recruiting several allies across Hell, including Viola (Sasha Grey) and Kiki DeWynter (Ashly Burch), Blackbeard (Matthew Mercer), William Shakespeare, and Vlad the Impaler (both Liam O'Brien). Eventually, Jezebel, who has begun rebelling against her father, finds Johnny and takes him to confront Satan. Johnny surrenders after Satan threatens to kill Jezebel, prompting Satan to name him worthy of marrying his daughter. Johnny agrees to do so after Satan promises to free Kinzie and the Boss in return, but changes his mind at the wedding and attempts to kill Satan. After killing his minions with Kinzie's help, Johnny defeats Satan, who banishes him, Kinzie, the Boss, and Jezebel back to the mortal realm.

However, Johnny is detained by God (Nathan Fillion), who reveals that Satan was plotting an invasion on Heaven since Zinyak hastened the Apocalypse by destroying Earth, and hoped to use the Boss as the general of his army. God offers to repay Johnny for defeating Satan, giving him one of five rewards: go to Heaven to be reunited with his girlfriend Aisha, return to Hell to become its new king, find a new homeworld for the Saints to rebuild humanity, recreate Earth, or be told the secrets of the universe. Recreating Earth leads to the timeline of Agents of Mayhem; the universe of Saints Row is retconed, and Johnny becomes a lieutenant within the Seoul police force, hoping to find his friends. As Kinzie and Matt Miller (Yuri Lowenthal) converse about a captured woman named "Brimstone", Johnny prepares to interrogate her.

Development
In December 2013, comedian Jay Mohr, who voiced antagonist Dane Vogel in Saints Row 2, revealed that he was doing voice work for the next Saints Row game. It was later revealed Volition would be unveiling a new game at PAX Prime on the August 29, 2014. They teased an image which depicts a Ouija board with the Saints' fleur-de-lis on it. Later, at their panel on the same day, Volition and Deep Silver confirmed a standalone expansion to Saints Row IV, called Saints Row: Gat out of Hell. The game was initially scheduled for release on January 27, 2015 for PlayStation 3, PlayStation 4, Windows, Xbox 360, and Xbox One but was later rescheduled to January 20, 2015 in North America and January 23, 2015 in Europe. The game will be released in a bundle alongside Saints Row IV: Re-Elected for PlayStation 4 and Xbox One.

The expansion was inspired, in part, by Disney films, which are among the "big loves" of the game's creative director, Steve Jaros. He wanted the game to parody the fairytale qualities and "whimsical love songs" of the Disney film genre. Parts of the plot were taken from such films, including the birthday party prologue from Sleeping Beauty, talking inanimate objects, princess Jezebel rebelling against her father, Satan, through her spousal choice, and musical acts where Satan sings sentimentally. The open world was designed to be a "fun toy box" that encouraged traversal through flight. The January 2015 launch trailer included a hotline phone number with promotional hold music.

Reception

Saints Row: Gat out of Hell received generally mixed reviews. Aggregating review website Metacritic gave the Microsoft Windows version a 66/100 based on 24 reviews, the Xbox One version a 65/100 based on 16 reviews and the PlayStation 4 version a 64/100 based on 45 reviews.

Brittany Vincent from Destructoid gave the game an 8/10, praising the game's setting, refreshing superpower abilities, new cast of characters, interesting types of enemies and entertaining world, which she stated "feels much more polished and finished than Saints Row IVs Steelport simulation." However, she criticized the game's short length. She summarized the review by saying "There's no agenda and no life lessons to learn in Saints Row. There's only pure escapism, which is what games are meant for in my view. Whenever I feel like I need a break, I will have Saints Row proudly on my shelf." Andrew Reiner from Game Informer gave the game a 7.5/10, praising the worthwhile side-activities, well-designed dialogues, satisfying transversal system, creative weapons and storytelling. However, he criticized the graphics, which he stated is on par with the last-generation version of Saints Row IV, as well as occasional framerate losses. He also criticized the game for lacking in gameplay complexity.

Mikel Reparaz from IGN criticized the game for lacking traditional story missions, as well as featuring repetitive side missions, unimpressive graphics, and being extremely buggy. Alex Carlson from Hardcore Gamer gave the game a 3.5/5, praising the voice-acting, dialogues, collectibles, flight mechanics and the game-world, which he stated "has a balance between familiar and fresh", but criticizing the game for being too similar to the original Saints Row IV in terms of the variety of superpower and mission types, as well as the middling story and graphical glitches. Phil Savage from PC Gamer gave the game a 67/100, praising the world design and in-game abilities such as flying, which he stated "has delivered a new sense of freedom". However, he criticized the lack of proper campaign missions and scripting, limited creativity as well as the poor combat system. He ended the review by saying that "Gat out of Hell offers all the open-world distractions of a Saints Row game, but it seldom displays the spark of creativity, which made [Saints Row: The Third and Saints Row IV] so remarkable."

References

External links

2015 video games
Action-adventure games
Cultural depictions of Blackbeard
Cultural depictions of William Shakespeare
Cultural depictions of Vlad the Impaler
Science fantasy video games
Science fiction comedy
Deep Silver games
Video games about demons
Divine Comedy
Linux games
Multiplayer and single-player video games
Open-world video games
Organized crime video games
Parody video games
PlayStation 3 games
PlayStation 4 games
PlayStation Network games
Saints Row
Self-reflexive video games
Seven deadly sins in popular culture
Fiction about the Devil
Video game expansion packs
Video game sequels
Video games about the afterlife
Video games based on the Bible
Video games developed in the United States
Video games set in the United States
Video games with alternate endings
Video games with downloadable content
Windows games
Xbox 360 games
Xbox 360 Live Arcade games
Xbox One games
Video games set in hell
High Voltage Software games